Chi Shangbin (19 September 1949 – 6 March 2021) was a Chinese football player and coach.

As player, he spent his whole career playing for Liaoning, and also represented China at international level. As manager, he was best known for his record at Dalian Wanda of 55 unbeaten run between 1995 and 1997 in the league, which brought him two Chinese Jia-A League titles.

Playing career
Chi Shangbin played for the Liaoning during his entire senior football career. He was called up by the China national football team since the 1970s, and took part in the AFC Asian Cup in 1976 and 1980, as well as the Asian Games in 1974, 1978 and 1982.

Managerial career

Earlier stages
After his retirement, Chi became an assistant manager at Beijing Army until 1987. He sought further study at Osaka University of Health and Sport Sciences, and was offered a chance to be the youth manager at Panasonic Gamba until 1995.

Dalian Wanda
In 1995, Chi returned to China to join the Jia-A league champion Dalian Wanda. The defending champion did not start well in the 1995 league, but continued their reigning performance under Chi's management. From 3 September 1995 until 18 December 1997, Dalian Wanda had an unbeaten run of 55 consecutive matches, which included an undefeated 1996 season. He won the 1996 and 1997 league titles, and was awarded Coach of the year in both seasons. He left Dalian Wanda after the 1997 season.

Sichuan Quanxing and second-tier experiences
In 1998, Chi briefly joined Sichuan Quanxing.

He then joined second tier club Xiamen Yuanhua in 1999, where he won a second-tier league title.

In 2000, Chi was appointed by the China national football team as part of the coaching staff for Bora Milutinović.

In 2003, Chi joined Henan Jianye, also in the Jia-B league. The team finished the season as runner-up.

In 2004, he joined Jiangsu Sainty.

Shenzhen Jianlibao
Chi joined reigning league champion Shenzhen Jianlibao in 2005 to replace Zhu Guanghu, who left for the Chinese national team. The team fell from grace and finished in 12th place in a difficult season. Chi resigned after only three months due to his poor relationship with the squad, especially with then-captain Li Weifeng and senior players like Li Yi and Yang Chen. Chi was unhappy due to the senior players' influential control over the team, their unprofessional behavior and discipline especially with gambling. He tried to regain control of the squad with his strictness, but most of the players reacted fiercely by training and playing even more poorly. Li Weifeng punched Chi's office window; Yang Chen, who is already a relatively gentle person got upset too and repeatedly exposed the uselessness of Chi's policy to media, which saw the then owner Yang Saixin having to let Chi go.

Dalian Aerbin 
In July 2009, Chi Shangbin was appointed by newly founded Dalian Aerbin as manager. Under his leadership Dalian Aerbin won the 2010 China Legue Two, and they were promoted into the China League One. He stepped out of the coaching staff to work as vice general manager since 2012, then general manager in 2013, and left the team in 2015.

Personal life 
Chi focused on youth training activities since 2015. He died of myocardial infarction on 6 March 2021. FIFA chairman Gianni Infantino paid tribute to him.

Honours

Player
Liaoning Team
China national league: 1978

Manager
Dalian Wanda
Chinese Jia-A League: 1996, 1997
Xiamen Yuanhua
Chinese Jia-B League: 1999
Dalian Aerbin
China League Two: 2010

Individual
Asian Coach of the Month: March 1997, December 1997

References

External links
Biography at sina.com

1949 births
2021 deaths
Chinese footballers
Chinese football managers
Footballers from Dalian
China international footballers
1976 AFC Asian Cup players
1980 AFC Asian Cup players
Liaoning F.C. players
Jiangsu F.C. managers
Henan Songshan Longmen F.C. managers
Shenzhen F.C. managers
Dalian Professional F.C. managers
Footballers at the 1974 Asian Games
Association football midfielders
Footballers at the 1978 Asian Games
Medalists at the 1978 Asian Games
Asian Games bronze medalists for China
Asian Games medalists in football